Michael Chang was the defending champion.

Thomas Enqvist won the title, beating Chang 0–6, 6–4, 6–0 in the final.

Seeds

Draw

Finals

Top half

Bottom half

Qualifying

Qualifying seeds

Qualifiers

Lucky loser
  David Nainkin

Qualifying draw

First qualifier

Second qualifier

Third qualifier

Fourth qualifier

References

External links
 Official results archive (ATP)
 Official results archive (ITF)

U.S. Pro Indoor
1995 ATP Tour